Olav Nordrå (25 December 1919, in Hammerfest – 28 April 1994) was a Norwegian writer.  He won the Riksmål Society Literature Prize in 1969.

External links
 

1919 births
1994 deaths
People from Hammerfest
Norwegian writers
20th-century Norwegian writers